The Mask and Mirror is the fifth studio album by Loreena McKennitt. Released in 1994, the album has been certified Gold in the United States.

Overview 

Like most of Loreena McKennitt's albums, The Mask and Mirror is heavily influenced by her travels. Her experiences in Spain and Morocco, specifically, serve as the inspiration for this album.

As her introduction to the album, McKennitt wrote:

Accompanying all the selections, as the liner remarks, are some of the entries in a traveler's log that McKennitt kept all throughout her journey.

The album's cover uses a collage made from the medieval The Hunt of the Unicorn tapestries.

Tracks 
Loreena McKennitt wrote the lyrics and composed the music for all the songs except as noted.

 "The Mystic's Dream" – 7:40
 "The Bonny Swans" (lyrics: traditional, arr. McKennitt, music by McKennitt) – 7:18
 "The Dark Night of the Soul" (lyrics by St. John of the Cross, OCD; arr. McKennitt; music by McKennitt) – 6:44
 "Marrakesh Night Market" – 6:30
 "Full Circle" – 5:57
 "Santiago" (traditional, arr. McKennitt) – 5:58
 "Cé Hé Mise le Ulaingt?/The Two Trees" (lyrics by W. B. Yeats, music by McKennitt) The opening of this song is "Cé Hé Mise Le Ulaingt" ("Who am I to Bear It" in Irish). It was written and performed by Patrick Hutchinson (http://www.patrickhutchinsonirishpiper.com/about.html) on Uilleann pipes. The second part of the song is Loreena's version of "The Two Trees." Hence the two titles. – 9:06
 "Prospero's Speech" (lyrics by William Shakespeare, arr. McKennitt, music by McKennitt) – 3:23

Song details 

 "The Mystic's Dream" was featured in the 2001 miniseries The Mists of Avalon and in the 1995 film Jade.
 "The Bonny Swans" was made into a video.
 "The Dark Night of the Soul" is based on the poem "Dark Night of the Soul" by the Roman Catholic mystic, priest, and Doctor of the Church St. John of the Cross, OCD.
 "Santiago" is named after the Spanish city of Santiago de Compostela, and the melody is based on a spirited arrangement of the early 13th-century song "Non é gran cousa se sabe," number 26 of the Cantigas de Santa Maria.
 "The Two Trees" derives its lyrics from a poem of William Butler Yeats.
 "Prospero's Speech" is the final soliloquy and epilogue by Prospero in William Shakespeare's play The Tempest.
 "Cé Hé Mise le Ulaingt?" and "The Two Trees" were both featured in the soundtrack of Highlander III: The Sorcerer as well as "Bonny Portmore" from the album The Visit).

Chart performance

Certifications and sales

References

1994 albums
Loreena McKennitt albums
Warner Records albums